Richard the Lionheart was a British ITV television series which ran from 1961 to 1963, aimed at younger audiences.

It began with the death of King Henry II, and put forward the traditional view of King Richard the Lionheart as a hero, and his brother Prince John (played by Trader Faulkner) as the villain.

Richard was played by Irish actor Dermot Walsh who said, "he was not always all one would like to see as a man. We have concentrated on his good side." Richard was perhaps a product of his time. A man brimful of contradictions. A brilliant general, but a poor ruler. A sensitive poet and singer.

The producers claimed that the series was based on fact as far as possible; though as little was known of Richard's personal life, "we have taken some liberties here and there," according to associate producer Brian Taylor in a TV Times article indicating the start of the series.

Other regular characters in the series included Sir Gilbert (Robin Hunter), Sir Geoffrey (Alan Haywood), Blondel (Iain Gregory), Leopold of Austria (Francis de Wolff) and Queen Berengaria (Sheila Whittingham).

According to BFI Screenonline "despite the treadmill efforts of the production... this routine swashbuckler, presenting an atmosphere of knightly conduct versus villainous skulduggery, was saved from total tedium by the presence of recurring players Trader Faulkner, a sneering Prince John, and Francis de Wolfe as the delightfully monstrous Leopold of Austria."

A single DVD was released by Stratx Digital Media on 6 June 2016. Although all episodes are thought to survive, the DVD contains only five episodes: "Long Live The King", "School For a King", "Crown In Danger", "The Pirate King" and "The Challenge". The picture quality for the most part is watchable, but the sound at times is flawed.

Cast

Dermot Walsh as King Richard The Lionheart
Robin Hunter as Sir Gilbert
Alan Haywood as Sir Geoffrey
Iain Gregory as Blondel
Trader Faulkner as Prince John/King Philip of France/Ubaldo
Sheila Whittingham as Queen Berengaria
Francis de Wolff as Leopold Of Austria
Max Faulkner as De Fleury
Michael Peake as Conrad of Montferrat
Ian Fleming as Lord Chancellor
Brian McDermott as Banister
Glyn Owen as Hugo
John Longden as Sir Thomas
Elwyn Brook-Jones as Count Rolf
David Davenport as 1st Courtier
Conrad Phillips as Guy of Lusignan
Anton Rodgers as Sir Kenneth
Marne Maitland as Saladin
 as Marta
Garard Green as Captain
Peter Reynolds as Sergeant Michael
Colin Tapley as Chamberlain
Julie Alexander as Lady Rosalie
Tom Bowman as Baron Fitz-Rheinfrid
Jennifer Daniel as Lady Edith
Howard Greene as Abdul
Prudence Hyman as Queen Eleanor
Steve Plytas as Ulric
Susan Shaw as Princess Alice
Robert Rietti as Father Ignatius
Jeremy Bisley as Second Prince
Brian Cobby as Captain
Lisa Daniely as Catherine
Hugo De Vernier as Duke of Aumerle
Peter Duguid as Old Arab
Humphrey Lestocq as La Motte
John Scott Martin as King William
Alan Rolfe as William
John Serret as Duke of Berri
Richard Shaw as Abbas
Derrick Sherwin as Alan
John Bay as 2nd English soldier
John Bennett as Kermal
Martin Benson as Forked Beard
Christopher Carlos as Theodore
Eric Dodson as Nur
Tony Doonan as Sir Miles
John Gabriel as De Glanville
Tom Gill as Fitzcormac
Olaf Pooley as Pilgrim
Raymond Rollett as De Bohm
Nigel Green as Hermit
Ralph Michael as Sheriff of Nottingham
Walter Randall as Second Sailor
Daphne Anderson as Lady Guinevere
Michael Ashlin as 2nd Courtier
Dawn Beret as Lady Blanche
Brandon Brady as Sergeant-at-Arms
Kevin Brennan as Bertram de la Marche
John Brooking as Steward
Robert Bruce as Royal servant
Vivienne Burgess as Maid
Ian Curry as Sir Roland
Hugh David as 1st Knight
Patrick Durkin as Guard
Peter Elliott as Simeon
Denzil Ellis as Steward
William Forbes as Tom the tracker
Silvia Francis as Lady Stephanie
Willoughby Goddard as Arnold de Chatillon
Nicholas Grimshaw as Physician
Laurence Hardy as Salivar
Reginald Hearne as Steward
Stuart Hillier as Herald of Scotland
Robert Hollyman as Monk
Peter Illing as Stephen de Tours
John Kelland as Sir Percy
David Ludman as 2nd Guard
Oliver MacGreevy as 1st Guard
Andreas Malandrinos as Gatekeeper
Zena Marshall as Zara
Francis Matthews as Sir Humphrey
Jack May as 2nd Knight
Ferdy Mayne as Merlin
Michael McStay as Knight
Riggs O'Hara as Ali
Katharine Page as Mother Maria
Bill Parsons as Priest
George Pastell as Gamal
Soraya Rafat as Villa
Hubert Rees as Chamberlain
Nadja Regin as Shirin
Dominic Roche as King Henry II
Alec Ross as 1st English soldier
Stuart Saunders as Landlord
Harold Siddons as Morgan
Vanessa Thornton as Lady-in-waiting
Hedger Wallace as Noble
Beresford Williams as Archbishop
Alister Williamson as Red Hugh
Norman Wynne as Harbour Master
Fred Abbott as Guard
Roger Bizley as First Thief
Tom Busby as First Sailor
Richard Caldicot as Baron Fitzgeorge
Golda Casimir as Jewish Woman
Noel Coleman as Sir Roland
Richard Dobson as Stable Boy
Clifford Earl as First Soldier
Anna Gerber as Farah
Nora Gordon as Innkeeper's Wife
Walter Gotell as Prince Otto
Neil Hallett as Lemuel
John Hatton as Second Arab
Joan Haythorne as Queen Eleanor
Eira Heath as Rose
John G. Heller as First Prince
Ronald Howard as Robin Hood
Jane Hylton as Megan
Jill Ireland as Marianne
Jennifer Jayne as Mary
Ann Lancaster as Second Onlooker
Howard Lang as First Shepherd
Philip Latham as Brian McFergus
Sean Lynch as Gangleader Demere
Robert MacKenzie as Sailor Guard
John Mahoney as Tailor
Bernard Martin as Guard
Bernadette Milnes as Girl
Peter Myers as Sir Hugh
Bill Nagy as Meredith
Michael O'Brien as Sir Thomas
Rasidi Onikoyi as Nubian
Roy Patrick as Captain
Ellen Pollock as Lady Melinda
Robert Raglan as Father Benedict
Frederick Rawlings as Third Onlooker
Robert Robinson as First Arab
Margaretta Scott as Duchess
John Southworth as Second Shepherd
Charles Stanley as First Onlooker
Donald Tandy as Herald of France
June Thorburn as Diane
Leon Cortez as Innkeeper
Michael Wells as Second Soldier
Jill Williams as Nora
Christopher Witty as Arthur
Michael Wynne as Captain
Colin Bean as Yeoman

References

External links
 

1960s British drama television series
1960s British children's television series
Cultural depictions of Richard I of England
Cultural depictions of Eleanor of Aquitaine
Black-and-white British television shows
English-language television shows
Television series set in the 12th century
Television shows shot at New Elstree Studios